Deepak Baij is an Indian politician. He was elected to the Lok Sabha, lower house of the Parliament of India from Bastar, Chhattisgarh in the 2019 Indian general election as member of the Indian National Congress.

References

External links
 Official biographical sketch in Parliament of India website

India MPs 2019–present
Lok Sabha members from Chhattisgarh
Living people
Indian National Congress politicians from Chhattisgarh
1981 births
People from Bastar district
Chhattisgarh MLAs 2008–2013
Chhattisgarh MLAs 2013–2018